The Franciscan Church of the Annunciation ( or commonly Frančiškanska cerkev) is a Franciscan church located on Prešeren Square in Ljubljana, the capital of Slovenia. It is the parish church of Ljubljana - Annunciation Parish. Its red colour is symbolic of the Franciscan monastic order. Since 2008, the church has been protected as a cultural monument of national significance of Slovenia.

Built between 1646 and 1660 (the bell towers following later), it replaced an older church on the same site. The early-Baroque layout takes the form of a basilica with one nave and two rows of side-chapels. The Baroque main altar was executed by the sculptor Francesco Robba. Many of the original frescoes were ruined by the cracks in the ceiling caused by the Ljubljana earthquake in 1895. The new frescoes were painted in 1936 by the Slovene impressionist painter Matej Sternen.

The front facade of the church was built in the Baroque style in 1703–1706 and redesigned in the 19th century. It has two parts, featuring pilasters with the Ionic capitals in the lower part and pilasters with Corinthian capitals in the upper part. The sides of the upper part are decorated with volutes and at the top of the front facade stands the statue of Our Lady of Loretto, i.e. Madonna with Child. It has been made of beaten copper by Matej Schreiner upon a plan drawn by Franz Kurz zum Thurn und Goldenstein. The faces and the hands were modelled by Franc Ksaver Zajec. The statue replaced an older wooden statue of a Black Madonna in 1858. The facade also has three niches with sculptures of God the Father above the main stone portal, and an angel and the Virgin Mary in the side niches, work by the Baroque sculptor Paolo Callalo. There is a stone entrance staircase in front of the church. The wooden door with reliefs of women's heads dates to the 19th century.

Next to the church, squeezed next to Prešeren Square between Čop Street, Nazor Street and Miklosich Street, there is a Franciscan Monastery dating from the 13th century. The monastery is notable for its library, containing more than 70,000 books, including many incunabulae and medieval manuscripts. Founded in 1233, the monastery was initially located at Vodnik Square, moving to the present location during the Josephine reforms of the late 18th century.

References

External links

Roman Catholic churches in Ljubljana
Annunciation
Roman Catholic churches completed in 1660
17th-century Roman Catholic church buildings in Slovenia
Baroque church buildings in Slovenia
Cultural monuments of Slovenia
1660 establishments in the Holy Roman Empire